The word generally means D. E. Shaw & Co, an American hedge fund, but may also refer to:

 David E. Shaw, an American billionaire and investment banker
 Dorothy Shaw, an Australian plant pathologist
 D. E. Shaw Research, an American biochemistry research company